Pavlos Kyriakidis (born 3 September 1991) is a Greek professional footballer who plays as a right back for Super League 2 club Niki Volos.

He has played football for Megas Alexandros Irakleia, Kozani, Paniliakos, Zakynthos and Iraklis.

Career
Kyriakidis started his career with Megas Alexandros Irakleia. In July 2010 he transferred to Kozani. With Kozani he had 28 appearances and scored 3 goals in the league, and 3 appearances in the cup.  In July 2011 he left Kozani for Paniliakos. In his first season with the club Kyriakidis appeared in 13 matches and scored 2 goals, before a torn cruciate ligament sidelined him in April. In his second season with Paniliakos he appeared in 16 matches and scored a further 2 goals.

On 30 August 2013 he signed for Zakynthos. He debuted for his new club in the season opener against Anagennisi Karditsa and scored his first goal against Pierikos. Totally he played in 20 matches and scored 2 goals for the club. On 22 July 2014 he signed for Greek Football League outfit Iraklis. His first appearance in Iraklis' shirt came in a pre-season friendly match against Kallithea.

References

External links
Myplayer.gr profile

1991 births
Living people
Gamma Ethniki players
Football League (Greece) players
Super League Greece players
Super League Greece 2 players
Cypriot First Division players
Kozani F.C. players
Paniliakos F.C. players
A.P.S. Zakynthos players
Iraklis Thessaloniki F.C. players
Atromitos F.C. players
OFI Crete F.C. players
Apollon Smyrnis F.C. players
Ermis Aradippou FC players
Niki Volos F.C. players
Greek footballers
Greek expatriate footballers
Greek expatriate sportspeople in Cyprus
Expatriate footballers in Cyprus
Association football fullbacks
Footballers from Kozani